Brick City is a nickname for Newark, New Jersey

Brick City may also refer to:

Brick City (band), contestants in The X Factor
Brick City (TV series), American documentary series
Brick City club - another name for the musical style called Jersey Club
Brick City, a local nickname for the Rochester Institute of Technology